Carlos Louis Boucher De Grand Pré  (October 25, 1745 – 1809) was Spanish governor of the  Baton Rouge district (1799–1808) and of Spanish West Florida (1805), as well as brevet colonel in the Spanish Army. He also served as lieutenant governor of Red River District and of the Natchez District.

Biography 
Grand Pré was born in New Orleans, and was baptized Charles Louis Grand Pré on 25 October 1745, at the parish church of St. Louis in New Orleans. His parents were the Canadian nobleman Louis Antoine Boucher de Grand Pré, a captain of the Compagnies Franches de la Marine and commandant of the Arkansas Post and Fort Tombecbe, and his Louisiana creole wife Thérèse Gallard. In Spanish records after 1769, his first name is usually given as "Carlos."

He participated in the expansion of Baton Rouge under Elias Beauregard, although its original authorization had not been compiled. Ownership of Louisiana changed several times during this time period.

Military career 

This was illustrated by taking the British military posts of Thompson's Creek and Amite River, under the command of Governor Bernardo de Gálvez, and the campaign for Fort Manchac and Fort New Richmond, in 1779. He served as commander of Pointe Coupée and as lieutenant governor of the Red River District, stationed at Avoyelles, under the Spanish regime.

Grand Pré was also commandant of Natchez District between 1786 and 1792. During this period, Grand Pré built two parishes here in an attempt to convert inhabitants to Catholicism; however, the venture was unsuccessful. In 1789, he established the "Concord" mansion in Natchez.  In a letter dated March 2, 1790, Carlos de Grand Pré created a list of tobacco farmers in the Natchez District, mainly from Kentucky and Virginia, that outlined production quantities and origination of each farm between the years of 1788 and 1790. After leaving Natchez, he received land around the Avoyelles Post.

Political career 
In 1799, Grand Pré was appointed governor of the Baton Rouge. The same year, the new governor proposed that the Spanish settlers from the Canary Islands who lived in Galvez Town settle in the new town of Spanish Town. He drew up the layout of an area east of the fort "out of cannon shot" which became known as Spanish Town.

As far back as 1804, there had been rumblings against the Spaniards and in August of that year, a group of Americans under the leadership of Reuben Kemper published a declaration of independence, captured the Spanish commander and his alcalde at Bayou Sara, and set out to capture Gov. Grand Pré at Baton Rouge. They had hoped to surprise the Spanish official, but Grand Pré was well-warned and the Americans withdrew after a little desultory shooting. The Kempers retired to Pinckneyville, just over the line in the Mississippi Territory, from where they kept up a running battle with the Spanish.

In 1805, Grand Pré was appointed governor of West Florida.  In this year, the new governor proposed the emigration of the Spanish settlers from the Canary Islands who lived in Galvez Town to settle down in the new town of Spanish Town. He drew up the layout of an area east of the fort 'out of cannon shot' that became known as Spanish Town.

An ultimate result of the activity of the Kempers and when Napoleon was attempting to install his brother on the Spanish throne was the recall of Grand Pré to Havana by the captain-general for questioning over his mild policies against the inhabitants. Grand Pré died in Cuba in 1809 while awaiting trial. According to his friend Pedro Favrot, he was executed for "pro-French" activities. Carlos de Hault de Lassus, who succeeded him as governor of the district of Baton Rouge, was much criticized for accused corruption and taken prisoner during the West Florida revolt in 1810.

References

External links 
A History of Baton Rouge 1699-1812. Posted by Rose Meyers

History of Louisiana
Spanish military personnel
People from Louisiana
People from Natchez, Mississippi
Governors of West Florida
1745 births
1809 deaths